Events from the year 1919 in the United States.

Incumbents

Federal Government 
 President: Woodrow Wilson (D-New Jersey)
 Vice President: Thomas R. Marshall (D-Indiana)
 Chief Justice: Edward Douglass White (Louisiana)
 Speaker of the House of Representatives: Champ Clark (D-Missouri) (until March 4), Frederick H. Gillett (R-Massachusetts) (starting May 19)
 Congress: 65th (until March 4), 66th (starting March 4)

Events

January
 January 1 – Edsel Ford succeeds his father as head of the Ford Motor Company.
January 6 – Theodore Roosevelt, the 26th President of the United States, dies in his sleep at the age of 60.
 January 15 – The Boston Molasses Disaster: A wave of molasses released from an exploding storage tank sweeps through Boston, killing 21 and injuring 150.
 January 16 – The 18th Amendment to the United States Constitution, authorizing Prohibition, goes into effect in the United States.
January 22 – The United States recognizes the independence of Poland.
 January 25 – The Hotel Pennsylvania opens in Manhattan.

February
 February 6 – The Seattle General Strike begins. Over 65,000 workers strike.
 February 11 – The Seattle General Strike ends when Federal troops are summoned by the state of Washington's Attorney General.
 February 25 – Oregon places a 1 cent per U.S. gallon (.26¢/L) tax on gasoline, becoming the first U.S. state to levy a gasoline tax.
 February 26 – An act of the United States Congress establishes most of the Grand Canyon as a United States National Park (see Grand Canyon National Park).

March
 March 3 – The Supreme Court of the United States upholds the conviction of Charles Schenck.
 March 5 – A. Mitchell Palmer becomes Attorney General of the United States through recess appointment.
 March 15 – The American Legion forms in Paris.

April
 April 13 – Eugene V. Debs enters prison at the Atlanta Federal Penitentiary in Atlanta, Georgia for speaking out against the draft during World War I.
 April 15 – Boston Telephone Strike of 1919 begins. Ends successfully for the telephone operators and supporters on April 20.
 April 30 – Several bombs are intercepted in the first wave of the 1919 United States anarchist bombings carried out by followers of Luigi Galleani.

May
 May 1 – Riots break out on International Labor Day in Cleveland, Ohio;  2 people are killed, 40 injured, and 116 arrested.
May 9 – The United States recognizes the independence of Finland.
 May 10 – Charleston riot in Charleston, South Carolina killing three black men; beginning of Red Summer.
 May 16 – A U.S. Navy Curtiss aircraft (NC-4), commanded by Albert Cushing Read, departs Trepassey, Newfoundland, for Lisbon via the Azores on the first transatlantic flight.
 May 23 – The University of California, Los Angeles (UCLA) is established as the Southern Branch of the University of California, making it the second-oldest undergraduate campus of the ten-campus University of California system. The school's motto is Fiat lux, "Let there be light."

June
 June 2 – Eight mail bombs are sent to prominent figures as part of the 1919 United States anarchist bombings.
 June 4 – Women's rights: The United States Congress approves the 19th Amendment to the United States Constitution, which would guarantee suffrage to women, and sends it to the U.S. states for ratification.
 June 5 – Baltimore Mine Tunnel Disaster.
 June 15 – Pancho Villa attacks Ciudad Juárez. When the bullets begin to fly to the U.S. side of the border, two units of the U.S. 7th Cavalry Regiment cross the border and repulse Villa's forces.
 June 28 – The Treaty of Versailles is signed, ending World War I.
 June – The Algonquin Round Table group of writers, critics, actors and wits led by Alexander Woollcott first meets at the Algonquin Hotel in New York City.

July

 July 1 – "Thirsty First": The Wartime Prohibition Act comes into effect.
 July 6 – The British dirigible airship R34 lands at Mineola, New York, completing the first transatlantic flight by airship.
 July 7 – The First Transcontinental Motor Convoy: The U.S. Army sends an expedition across the continental U.S., starting in Washington, D.C., to determine how well troops could be moved from one side of the country to the other by motor vehicles.
 July 18 – 1919 Kimball mining disaster.
 July 21 – Wingfoot Air Express crash: The Goodyear dirigible airship Wingfoot Air Express catches fire over downtown Chicago and crashes into the Illinois Trust and Savings Building; 2 passengers, 1 crew member, and 10 people on the ground are killed; 2 people parachute to the ground safely.
 July 27 – The Chicago Race Riot of 1919 begins when a white man throws rocks at a group of 4 black teens on a raft.

August
 August 1–6 – 1919 Streetcar Strike of Los Angeles occurs.
 August 11 – The first NFL team for Wisconsin (the Green Bay Packers) is founded by Curly Lambeau. 
 August 30 – After a three-way splintering of the Socialist Party of America, the leadership of the remaining 30,000 members of the Right Wing of the Socialist party continue their national convention in Chicago on August 30, 1919.
 August 31 – In a three-way splintering of the Socialist Party of America, the leadership of the 10,000 native-born English speaking members of the Left Wing form the Communist Labor Party of America in Chicago on August 31, 1919.

September
 September 1 – In a three-way splintering of the Socialist Party of America, the leadership of the 60,000 alien members of the Left Wing form the Communist Party of America at a separate convention in Chicago on September 1, 1919.
 September 6 – The First Transcontinental Motor Convoy: The U.S. Army expedition across America, which started July 7, ends in San Francisco.
 September 9 - The Boston Police Strike occurs.
 September 10 – September 15: The Florida Keys Hurricane kills 600 in the Gulf of Mexico, Florida and Texas.
 September 22 – The Steel strike of 1919 begins across the United States. 
 September 28 – Omaha Riot: A lynch mob besieges the police station and courthouse in Omaha, Nebraska, and lynches alleged rapist Will Brown.

October
 October 1 – The Elaine Race Riot breaks out in Arkansas.
 October 2 – President Woodrow Wilson suffers a massive stroke, leaving him partially paralyzed.
 October 9 - Black Sox Scandal: The Chicago White Sox throw the World Series.
 October 16 – Ripley's Believe It or Not! first appears as a cartoon under this title in The New York Globe.
 October 28 – Prohibition begins: The United States Congress passes the Volstead Act over President Woodrow Wilson's veto.

November
 November 1 – The Coal Strike of 1919 begins in the United States by the United Mine Workers under John L. Lewis. Final agreement comes on December 10.
 November 7 – The first Palmer Raid is conducted on the second anniversary of the Russian Revolution. Over 10,000 suspected communists and anarchists are arrested in 23 different U.S. cities.
 November 9 – Felix the Cat appears in Feline Follies, making him the first cartoon character.
 November 10 – The first national convention of the American Legion is held in Minneapolis, Minnesota (until November 12).
 November 11 – The Centralia Massacre in Centralia, Washington results in the deaths of four members of the American Legion, and the lynching of a local leader of the Industrial Workers of the World (IWW).
 November 14 – Sigma Delta Pi, the National Collegiate Hispanic Honor Society (La Sociedad Nacional Honoraria Hispánica), was established at the University of California Berkeley in Berkeley, California.
 November 19 – The Treaty of Versailles fails a critical ratification vote in the United States Senate. It will never be ratified by the US.
 November 27 – Kappa Kappa Psi, National Honorary Band Fraternity, is established at Oklahoma A&M College (now named Oklahoma State University) in Stillwater, Oklahoma.

December
 December 19 – The fictional character Ham Gravy makes his début in Thimble Theatre comics.
 December 21 – The United States deports 249 people, including Emma Goldman, to Russia during the Red Scare.
 December 26 – Babe Ruth is sold by the Boston Red Sox to the New York Yankees for $125,000, the largest sum ever paid for a player at that time. The deal is announced on January 6, 1920 and begins the 84-year-long "Curse of the Bambino".

Undated
 Various strikes occur in the United States: Strike of US railroad workers; The Longshoreman's strike; The Great Steel Strike; and a general strike in Seattle, Washington.
 US President Wilson promises eventual independence for Philippines, though subsequent Republican administrations see it as a distant goal.
 The World League Against Alcoholism is established by the Anti-Saloon League.
 First Security Bank – Montana is founded (as Security Bank and Trust).

Ongoing
 Progressive Era (1890s–1920s)
 Lochner era (c. 1897–c. 1937)
 U.S. occupation of Haiti (1915–1934)
 First Red Scare (1917–1920)

Births

January

 January 1 – J. D. Salinger, author notable for the novel Catcher in the Rye (died 2010)
 January 2 – Charles Willeford, writer (died 1988)
 January 3 
Zara Cisco Brough, Nipmuc Chief (died 1988)
Dorothy Morrison, actress (died 2017)
 January 4 – Lester L. Wolff, politician (died 2021)
 January 7 – Steve Belichick, American football player, coach and scout (died 2005)
 January 10 – Amzie Strickland, actress (died 2006)
 January 13 – Robert Stack, actor (The Untouchables) (died 2003)
 January 14 – Andy Rooney, journalist (60 Minutes) (died 2011)
 January 23 – Ernie Kovacs, American comedian (died 1962)
 January 24 – Leon Kirchner, American composer (d. 2009)
 January 25
 Edwin Newman, journalist and writer (NBC Nightly News) (died 2010)
 Eula Beal, contralto (died 2008)
 January 27 – Ross Bagdasarian Sr., actor, pianist, singer, songwriter, record producer and creator of Alvin and the Chipmunks (died 1972)
 January 28 – Gabby Gabreski, American fighter ace (d. 2002)
 January 30
 John C. Elliott, politician and 39th Governor of American Samoa (1952) (died 2001)
 Fred Korematsu, Japanese-American civil rights activist (d. 2005)
 January 31 – Jackie Robinson, African-American baseball player (d. 1972)

February
 February 7 – Desmond Doss, American combat medic (died 2006)
 February 9, Protestant ecumenical theologian (died 2004)
Robert Martin, fighter pilot (died 2018)
 February 12 – Forrest Tucker, actor (F Troop) (died 1986)
 February 15 – Norman Garbo, author and lecturer (died 2017)
 February 13
Tennessee Ernie Ford, musician (died 1991)
 Eddie Robinson, football coach (died 2007)
 February 16 – Charlie Parlato, musician (died 2007)
 February 18 – Jack Palance, actor (died 2006)
 February 19 – William Gianelli, politician (died 2020)
 February 21 – Malcolm E. Beard, politician (died 2019)
 February 25 – Monte Irvin, African-American baseball player (died 2016)
 February 26 – Mason Adams, actor (died 2005)

March
 March 2 – Jennifer Jones, actress (died 2009)
 March 4 – Buck Baker, racecar driver (died 2002)
 March 5 – Myron H. Bright, U.S. federal judge (died 2016)
 March 7 – Mary Ann Hawkins, surfing pioneer, diver, swimmer and stunt double (died 1993)
 March 13 – Jack P. Lewis, Biblical scholar (died 2018)
 March 14 – Max Shulman, comedic writer (died 1988)
 March 15 – Lawrence Tierney, actor (died 2002)
 March 17 – Nat King Cole, African-American singer (died 1965)
 March 24
 Lawrence Ferlinghetti, poet and publisher (died 2021)
 Robert Heilbroner, economist (died 2005)
 March 25 – Jeanne Cagney, actress (died 1984)
 March 26 – Strother Martin, actor (died 1980)
 March 27 – John Kotz, basketball player (died 1999)
 March 28 – Dewey F. Bartlett, U.S. Senator from Oklahoma from 1967 to 1971 (died 1979)
 March 29 – Eileen Heckart, actress (died 2001)
 March 30 – McGeorge Bundy, U.S. National Security Advisor (died 1996)

April
 April 1 – Joseph Murray, transplant surgeon, Nobel Prize laureate (died 2012)
 April 3 – Ervin Drake, songwriter (died 2015)
 April 4 – Charles O. Porter, politician (died 2006)
 April 6 – Caren Marsh Doll, actress and dancer
 April 12 – Billy Vaughn, singer, multi-instrumentalist and orchestra leader (died 1991)
 April 13
 Howard Keel, singer, dancer and actor (Dallas) (died 2004)
 Madalyn Murray O'Hair, née Mays, atheist activist (died 1995)
 Phil Tonken, radio and television announcer (died 2000)
 April 16
Merce Cunningham, dancer and choreographer (died 2009)
 Edward Simons Fulmer, American Army Air Forces officer (died 2017)
 April 18 – Samuel L. Myers Sr., economist (died 2021)
 April 22 – Donald J. Cram, chemist, Nobel Prize laureate (d. 2001) 
 April 27 – Victor Wouk, scientist (died 2005)

May
 May 1 – Lewis Hill, broadcaster, co-founder of Pacifica Radio (d. 1957)
 May 3
John Cullen Murphy, comic strip artist (died 2004) 
Pete Seeger, folk singer and musician (died 2014)
 May 4 – Dory Funk, professional wrestler (died 1973)
 May 8 – Lex Barker, actor (died 1973)
 May 10 – Daniel Bell, sociologist (died 2011)
 May 16 – Liberace, pianist (died 1987)
 May 17 – Ronald Verlin Cassill, novelist, short story writer, editor, painter, and lithographer (died 2002)
 May 20 – George Gobel, comedian (died 1991)
 May 21 – Wense Grabarek, politician (died 2019)
 May 30 – Joe McQueen, jazz saxophonist (died 2019)
 May 31 – Vance Hartke, U.S. Senator from Indiana from 1959 to 1977 (died 2003)

June
 June 6 – Doris Merrick, actress and model (died 2019)
 June 7 – George Glamack, basketball player (died 1987)
 June 9 – Jimmy Newberry, baseball player (died 1983)
 June 11 – Helen Tobias-Duesberg, Estonian-American pianist and composer (died 2010)
 June 14 – Gene Barry, actor (died 2009)
 June 15 – Charles Kaman, aeronautical engineer (died 2011)
 June 19 – Pauline Kael, film critic (died 2001)
 June 22 – Clifton McNeely, basketball player and coach (died 2003)
 June 23 – R. C. Pitts, basketball player (died 2011)
 June 24
Al Molinaro, actor (died 2015)
Jack Naylor, inventor (died 2007)
 June 26 
George Athan Billias, historian (died 2018)
Richard Neustadt, political historian (died 2003)
 June 28 – Joseph P. Lordi, government official (died 1983)
 June 30 – Ed Yost, inventor (died 2007)

July
 July 1 – Gerald E. Miller, vice admiral (died 2014) 
 July 7 
William Kunstler, lawyer and civil rights activist (died 1995)
Earl Mazo, journalist, author, and government official (died 2007)
Harry Zeller, professional basketball player (died 2004)
 July 11 – Donald Zilversmit, Dutch-born U.S. nutritional biochemist, researcher and educator (died 2010)  
 July 13
Joe Gill, magazine writer and comic book scripter (died 2006)
William F. Quinn, politician (died 2006)
 July 14
 Cleveland Clark, Negro league baseball player
 Marion F. Kirby, ace in the United States Army Air Forces (died 2011)
 Hal Lahar, American football player and coach (died 2003)
 Eugene Allen, waiter and butler (died 2010)
 July 15
Mike Karmazin, American football guard (died 2004)
Everett P. Pope, United States Marine (died 2009)
 July 17 – Milt Smith, American football player and business operator (died 2010)
 July 19 – Dallas McKennon, voice actor (died 2009)
 July 22 – Allie Paine, college basketball standout (died 2008)
 July 26 – Virginia Gilmore, actress (died 1986)
 July 31 – Robert M. Morgenthau, lawyer (died 2019)

August
 August 13
 Rex Humbard, television evangelist (died 2007)
 George Shearing, Anglo-American jazz pianist (died 2011)
 August 14 – Isaac C. Kidd Jr., admiral (died 1999)
 August 17 – Georgia Gibbs, singer (died 2006) ***
 August 18 – Walter Joseph Hickel, 2nd and 8th Governor of Alaska (died 2010)
 August 20
 Walter Bernstein, screenwriter and producer (died 2021)
 Thomas G. Morris, politician (died 2016)
 August 22 – Larry Winn, American politician (died 2017)
 August 25 – George Wallace, 45th Governor of Alabama (died 1998)
 August 28 – Ben Agajanian, American football player (died 2018)
 August 29 – Sono Osato, dancer and actress (died 2018)

September
 September 4 – Howard Morris, actor (d. 2005)
 September 5 – Tom Jordan, Major League Baseball player (died 2019)
 September 6
 Lee Archer, U.S. fighter pilot (died 2010)
 September 9 – Barbara Fiske Calhoun, American WWII cartoonist and painter; co-founded Quarry Hill Creative Center in Rochester, Vermont, where she taught art and helped establish the ideals of the group. Born Isabelle Daniel Hall in Tucson, Arizona (Died 2014).
John Mitchum, actor (died 2001)
 September 14 – Kay Medford, character actress and comedian (died 1980)  
 September 24
 Rick Vallin, Russian-American actor (died 1977)
 Jack Costanzo, percussionist (died 2018)
 Dayton Allen, comedian and voice actor (died 2004) 
 September 27 
Jayne Meadows, actress (d. 2015)
Charles H. Percy, U.S. Senator from Illinois from 1967 to 1985 (died 2011)

October
 October 3 – James M. Buchanan, economist, Nobel Prize laureate (died 2013)
 October 11 – Art Blakey, jazz drummer (died 1990)
 October 12
 Mary Ainslee, film actress (died 1991)
 Doris Miller, sailor (died 1943)
 October 13 – Jackie Ronne, born Edith Maslin, Antarctic explorer (died 2009)
 October 14 – Edward L. Feightner, U.S. navy officer (d. 2020)
 October 16 – Kathleen Winsor, writer (died 2003)
 October 17 – Charles Y. Glock, sociologist (died 2018)
 October 18 – Anita O'Day, jazz singer (died 2006)
 October 21 – Donald West VanArtsdalen, federal judge (died 2019)
 October 25 – Norman A. Erbe, 35th Governor of Iowa (died 2000)
 October 26
Edward Brooke, U.S. Senator from Massachusetts from 1967 to 1979 (died 2015)
James E. Myers, songwriter (died 2001)
Jacob Pressman, rabbi, co-founder of American Jewish University (died 2015)
 October 27 – Jeremiah Stamler, cardiologist (died 2018)
 October 30 – Takuma Tanada, Japanese-American biologist (died 2018)

November
 November 2 – Bill Mills, Major League Baseball player (died 2019)
 November 3
Bert Freed, American character actor and voice-over actor (died 1994)
Spider Jorgensen, baseball player and coach (died 2003)
 November 4 
 Martin Balsam, actor (died 1996)
 Shirley Mitchell, actress (died 2013)
 November 5 – Myron Floren, accordionist (The Lawrence Welk Show) (died 2005)
 November 10 – Michael Strank, U.S. Marine flag raiser on Iwo Jima (died 1945)
 November 15 
Carol Bruce, singer and actress (died 2007)
Leo Marx, historian and literary critic (died 2022)
Joseph Wapner, judge and TV personality (died 2017)
 November 19 
 Ken Buehler, basketball player (died 2019)
 Elizabeth Strohfus, aviator (died 2016) 
 November 26 – Frederik Pohl, science fiction writer (died 2013)
 November 30 – Johnnie Jones, civil rights attorney (died 2022)

December
 December 1 – Charles Steen, geologist and businessman (died 2006)
 December 2 – Norma Miller, African-American dancer, choreographer, actress, author and comedian (died 2019)  
 December 7 – Charles McGee, member of the Tuskegee Airmen, served as a USAF officer until 1973 (died 2022)
 December 8 – Lorraine H. Morton, politician (died 2018)
 December 9
 Bert J. Harris Jr., politician (died 2019)
William Lipscomb, chemist, Nobel Prize laureate (died 2011)
 December 14 – Margie Stewart, model and actress (died 2012)
 December 15 – Max Yasgur, farmer (died 1973) 
 December 21
 Larry Eisenberg, writer (died 2018)
 Tommy Byrne, baseball player (died 2007)
 Doug Young, voice actor (died 2018)
 December 27 – Charles Sweeney, WWII pilot (died 2004)
 December 31 – Recy Taylor, activist (died 2017)

Deaths 
 January 2 – Eliza Putnam Heaton, journalist and editor (born 1860)
 January 6 
Max Heindel, Danish-American astrologer and mystic (born 1865)
Theodore Roosevelt, 26th President of the United States from 1901 to 1909, 25th Vice President of the United States from March to September 1901 (born 1858)
 January 7 – Henry Ware Eliot, industrialist and philanthropist (born 1843)
 January 8 – Jim O'Rourke, baseball player and MLB Hall of Famer (born 1850)
 January 14 – Shelley Hull, stage & film actor, husband of Josephine Hull, brother of Henry Hull (born 1884)
 January 31 – Nat C. Goodwin, veteran stage star & silent film actor (born 1857; apoplexy)
 January 27 – French Ensor Chadwick, admiral (born 1844)
 February 18 – Henry Ragas, jazz pianist (born 1891)
 March 23 – Henry Blossom, lyricist (born 1866)
 April 8 – Frank Winfield Woolworth, businessman (born 1852)
 April 9 
Sidney Drew, actor (born 1863)
James Reese Europe, jazz musician and composer, band leader (born 1881; stabbed in fight)
 April 15 – Jane Delano, nurse and founder or the American Red Cross Nursing Service (born 1862)
 May 6 – L. Frank Baum, author, poet, playwright, actor and independent filmmaker (The Wizard of Oz) (born 1856)
 May 14 – Henry John Heinz, businessman (born 1844)
 May 12 – D. M. Canright, Seventh-day Adventist minister and author, later one of the church's severest critics (born 1840)
 May 13 – Helen Hyde, etcher and engraver (born 1868)
 May 21 – Lamar Johnstone, silent film actor and director (born 1885)
 May 25 – Madam C. J. Walker, African American entrepreneur and philanthropist (born 1867)
 c. June 1 – Caroline Still Anderson, African American physician, educator and activist (born 1848)
 July 8 – John Fox Jr., journalist, novelist and short story writer (born 1862; pneumonia)
 August 1 – Oscar Hammerstein I, musical theatre impresario (born 1847)
 August 9 – Ralph Albert Blakelock, American painter (born 1847)
 August 11 – Andrew Carnegie, industrialist (born 1835 in Scotland)
 October 30 – Ella Wheeler Wilcox, author and poet (born 1850)
 November 23 – Henry Gantt, project engineer (born 1861)
 November 24 – William Stowell, silent film actor and director (born 1885)
 December 2 – Henry C. Frick, industrialist (born 1849)
 December 7 – J. Thompson Baker, politician from New Jersey (born 1847)
 December 10 – William E. Miller soldier and Pennsylvania State Senator (born 1836)

See also
 List of American films of 1919
 Timeline of United States history (1900–1929)

References

External links
 

 
1910s in the United States
United States
United States
Years of the 20th century in the United States